The term cabaret service (also known as dejeuner service) is used to designate small tea or coffee services. A typical cabaret service includes (in addition to cups and saucers) a teapot or a coffeepot (with a lid and sometimes a stand), a sugar bowl, a creamer, and sometimes a tray. In the 18th century a spoon boat was frequently a part of the set. The tea- and coffeepots are small (one pint in a service for two, so called tête-à-tête, half a pint in a solitaire service for one), the cups and saucers are frequently also smaller than the ones in the regular sets. Tête-à-tête services were popular as wedding gifts.

The cabaret services originated in France, where the tea drinking was not ritualized, and thus small-scale arrangements for one or two were appropriate. The cabaret services characteristically utilized unusual designs and extensive decorations, this "jewel-like" appearance hints at marketing oriented towards ladies.

References

Sources
 
 
 

Teaware
Coffeeware